Upper Merion Area High School is a comprehensive public high school, operated by the Upper Merion Area School District, in the King of Prussia census-designated place, in Upper Merion Township, Pennsylvania, in the Philadelphia metropolitan area.

A building project to construct a new high school facility began in the spring of 2020, and is scheduled to be completed in September, 2022.

Overview
Upper Merion Area High School (UMAHS) serves students from three communities: Upper Merion Township, Bridgeport and West Conshohocken boroughs. The high school building is located approximately fifteen miles west of Philadelphia.  Recognizing the importance of long-standing traditions, students at the Upper Merion Area High School are instrumental in continuing to add school spirit opportunities to the already existing traditions. These traditions include Fall and Spring spirit weeks, homecoming, appointing Homecoming King and Queen, pep rallies, Diversity Day, and more. Students at UMAHS are not only members of the academic student body, but also participate in many extracurricular programs including sports teams, clubs, service learning opportunities, community service, theatre productions, art exhibitions, and student council. Many of these activities are sponsored and led by UMAHS staff and community members. Participation in the numerous clubs and activities supports the notion that students of UMAHS are proud to be part of the “Viking Nation".

Sports 
Upper Merion has been a member of the Pioneer Athletic Conference since 2016.  

Upper Merion Area High School offers the following sports:

In 2004, Upper Merion Football won the school's first PIAA District One Championship against the Great Valley Patriots. Led by seniors (FB) Marcus Johnson, (QB) Chuck DiNolfi, (RB/WR) Sean Donovan, and D-1 recruit (OT, DT) Dan Butts all two-way starters. UM dominated at every aspect of the game, both in the trenches and the X's and O's. Finishing the year with a record of 11-3. Graduating 28 seniors.

UM's varsity track and field relay team placed 6th in the state of Pennsylvania in the 4 × 800 meter relay at Shippensburg University. At 7:55.30, it broke a 26-year-old school record. The winning team consisted of leadoff leg, Mike Brothers, 2nd leg, Jon Gries, 3rd leg, Matthew Cunningham, and anchor, Ronak Patel.

Upper Merion Area High School's varsity track and field relay team was crowned Suburban One-American Champions in the 4 × 400 meter relay in the 2005 Spring season, at 3.25.82. The winning relay team consisted of leadoff leg, Nicholas Tsipras, 2nd leg, Matthew Cunningham, 3rd leg, Ronak Patel, and anchor, Sean Donovan.

Upper Merion Area High School's varsity baseball team was crowned PIAA District I Champions in their 2008-2009 season.

Upper Merion Area High School's varsity boys lacrosse team was crowned Suburban One-American Champions in their 2010 season.

The varsity girls volleyball team was crowned PIAA District I Champions in the 2010-2011 season. They went on to compete in the PIAA State Championship where they finished as the 2nd best volleyball team in Pennsylvania.

The varsity volleyball team was also crowned PIAA District 1 Champions in the 2013 and 2014 season. They lost in the quarterfinals of the PIAA State Championship 2013 and lost in the first round in 2014. Adding to a total of six District 1 Championships for the volleyball team.

Upper Merion Lady Vikings were crowned Surburban One League Champions in Softball during the 2013, 2014, 2015, and 2016 seasons.

Echoes in the Darkness 
In 1987, the school was the setting for Echoes in the Darkness, a Joseph Wambaugh book detailing the murder of a teacher and her two children for insurance money, allegedly by the head of the English department and the former principal.  This was later converted into a made-for-TV movie starring Stockard Channing, Peter Coyote and Robert Loggia.    

This book and movie were interpretations of the "Mainline Murders", with multiple of the teachers portrayed in the movie teaching within the English and Spanish departments into the 2000's at Upper Merion Area High School.  Jay Smith was originally convicted, but had his conviction overturned.  William Bradfield was convicted and died in prison.

Notable alumni
Greg Gianforte - Businessman and U.S. Representative from Montana.
Kathy Jordan - Professional tennis player.
Lisa Salters - ESPN sports reporter.
Brad Scioli - Former professional football player for Indianapolis Colts
Bob Shoudt - Competitive Eater
John "Gus" Herman - Professional Person

References

Public high schools in Pennsylvania
Schools in Montgomery County, Pennsylvania
Educational institutions established in 1963
1963 establishments in Pennsylvania